Brügge is a municipality in the district of Rendsburg-Eckernförde, in Schleswig-Holstein, Germany.
Its small church and market square are noted for their beauty.

References

Rendsburg-Eckernförde